Tosca is a genus of moth in the family Gelechiidae.

Species
 Tosca elachistella (Busck, 1906)
 Tosca plutonella Heinrich, 1920
 Tosca pollostella (Busck, 1906)

References

Anomologini